Steven Russell Young (born July 18, 1953) is a former National Football League offensive tackle who played for the Tampa Bay Buccaneers and Miami Dolphins from 1976 to 1977. He attended Chaffey High School and then the University of Colorado before being drafted by the Buccaneers in the third round, 61st overall, in the 1976 NFL Draft.

References

Living people
1953 births
Tampa Bay Buccaneers players
Miami Dolphins players
American football offensive tackles
Colorado Buffaloes football players
Players of American football from Spokane, Washington